is a 1932 Japanese silent drama film directed by Mikio Naruse, based on a novel by Shunyo Yanagawa. It is the first surviving feature-length film by the director.

Plot
After five years overseas, star actress Tamae returns to Japan to reunite with her daughter Shigeko, whom she left behind with her then husband Atsumi in favour of her career. In her absence, Atsumi has married again, and the bond between Shigeko and her stepmother Masako has grown as strong as between a blood-related child and mother. When Atsumi's company goes bankrupt and his family is forced to move to lower-class surroundings, Tamae sees her chance to lure Shigeko away, but eventually has to accept that her wealth can't compensate for Shigeko's and Masako's mutual love.

Cast
Yoshiko Okada as Tamae Kiyooka
Shin'yō Nara as Shunsaku Atsumi
Yukiko Tsukuba as Masako, Atsumi's wife
Toshiko Kojima as Shigeko, Atsumi's daughter
Fumiko Katsuragi as Kishiyo, Atsumi's mother
Jōji Oka as Masaya Kusakabe
Ichirō Yūki as Keiji Makino
Shozaburo Abe as "Gen the Pelican"

Analysis
Naruse biographer Catherine Russell linked No Blood Relation to other Naruse films of the same era like Three Sisters With Maiden Hearts, Wife! Be Like a Rose! and The Girl in the Rumor, by using the popular but controversial figure of the moga (modern Japanese girl with Western values and Western fashion style), who contrasted with another woman or sister.

References

External links

1932 films
1932 drama films
Japanese black-and-white films
Japanese drama films
1930s Japanese-language films
Japanese silent films
Films based on works by Japanese writers
Films directed by Mikio Naruse
Shochiku films
Silent drama films